Gregada is a Croatian dish from the island Hvar. The dish most likely has its origins in Illyrian culinary traditions and is one of the oldest ways to prepare fish in Dalmatia.

References 

Croatian cuisine
Fish stews